Futa River is a river in Los Ríos Region, Chile. It drains waters from the cordillera at the Valdivian Coast Range border north to Tornagaleones River, which in turn flows into the Pacific Ocean at Corral Bay.

See also
List of rivers of Chile

Rivers of Chile
Rivers of Los Ríos Region